Joachim "Jim" Lambek  (5 December 1922 – 23 June 2014) was a German-born Canadian mathematician. He was Peter Redpath Emeritus Professor of Pure Mathematics at McGill University, where he earned his PhD degree in 1950 with Hans Zassenhaus as advisor.

Biography 
Lambek was born in Leipzig, Germany, where he attended a Gymnasium. He came to England in 1938 as a refugee on the Kindertransport. From there he was interned as an enemy alien and deported to a prison work camp in New Brunswick, Canada. There, he began in his spare time a mathematical apprenticeship with Fritz Rothberger, also
interned, and wrote the McGill Junior Matriculation in fall of 1941. In the spring of 1942, he was released and settled in Montreal, where he entered studies at McGill University, graduating with an honours mathematics degree in 1945 and an MSc a year later. In 1950, he completed his doctorate under Hans Zassenhaus becoming McGill's first PhD in mathematics.

Lambek became assistant professor at McGill; he was made a full professor in 1963. He spent his sabbatical year 1965–66 in at the Institute for Mathematical Research at ETH Zurich, where Beno Eckmann had gathered together a group of researchers interested in algebraic topology and category theory, including Bill Lawvere. There Lambek reoriented his research into category theory.

Lambek retired in 1992 but continued his involvement at McGill's mathematics department. In 2000 a festschrift celebrating Lambek's contributions to mathematical structures in computer science was published. On the occasion of Lambek's 90th birthday, a collection Categories and Types in Logic, Language, and Physics was produced in tribute to him.

Scholarly work 
Lambek's PhD thesis investigated vector fields using the biquaternion algebra over Minkowski space, as well as semigroup immersion in a group. The second component was published by the Canadian Journal of Mathematics. He later returned to biquaternions when in 1995 he contributed "If Hamilton had prevailed: Quaternions in Physics", which exhibited the Riemann–Silberstein bivector to express the free-space electromagnetic equations.

Lambek supervised 17 doctoral students, and has 75 doctoral descendants as of 2020. He has over 100 publications listed in the Mathematical Reviews, including 6 books. His earlier work was mostly in module theory, especially torsion theories, non-commutative localization, and injective modules. One of his earliest papers, proved the Lambek–Moser theorem about integer sequences. In 1963 he published an important result, now known as Lambek's theorem, on character modules characterizing flatness of a module. He is noted, among other things, for the Lambek calculus, an effort to capture mathematical aspects of natural language syntax in logical form, and a work that has been very influential in computational linguistics, as well as for developing the connections between typed lambda calculus and cartesian closed categories (see Curry–Howard–Lambek correspondence). His last works were on pregroup grammar.

Selected works

Books

Articles
 
 
 
 
 
 
 
 
  Reprinted in

References

External links
 Faculty profile of Joachim Lambek at McGill University
 Lambek festival (80th anniversary)

1922 births
2014 deaths
20th-century Canadian mathematicians
21st-century Canadian mathematicians
21st-century German mathematicians
Algebraists
Canadian logicians
Category theorists
Kindertransport refugees
German emigrants to Canada